D60 is a state road in Dalmatia region of Croatia connecting D1 state road in Brnaze to Vinjani Donji border crossing to Sovići, Bosnia and Herzegovina via Imotski.

The road also provides connections to numerous towns and cities in Dalmatian hinterland, most notably to Imotski, Cista Provo, Trilj either directly or via numerous roads connecting to D60. The road also serves traffic to and from other, numerous border crossings to Bosnia and Herzegovina in the area via several county roads connecting to the D60 state road.

The road, as well as all other state roads in Croatia, is managed and maintained by Hrvatske ceste, a state-owned company.

Traffic volume 

Traffic is regularly counted and reported by Hrvatske ceste, operator of the road. Substantial variations between annual (AADT) and summer (ASDT) traffic volumes are attributed to the fact that the road serves as a connection to A1 motorway and D1 state road carrying substantial tourist traffic.

Road junctions and populated areas

Sources

D060
D060